Lord George Murray (30 January 1761 – 3 June 1803) was an Anglican cleric best remembered for his work developing Britain's first optical telegraph, which began relaying messages from London to Deal in 1796, a few years after Claude Chappe's system began operation in France. He was Bishop of Saint David's from 1801 until his death.

Life
Murray was the second son of John Murray, 3rd Duke of Atholl. He was Archdeacon of Man from 1787 to 1801. 
On 19 November 1800, Murray was nominated bishop of St. David's. He was elected on 6 December, confirmed on 7 and consecrated on 11 February 1801. 
He caught a chill waiting for his carriage on leaving the House of Lords, and died at Cavendish Square on 3 June 1803.

Family
On 18 December 1780, he married Anne Charlotte Grant (bap. 9 August 1765 – 27 April 1844), Lady-in-Waiting to Queen Charlotte. He had nine children;

 Charlotte Sophia Murray (1785–1866); married Rev. Townshend Selwyn (1782–1853), Canon of Gloucester. 
 George Murray  (12 January 1784 – 16 February 1860); Bishop of Sodor and Man and Bishop of Rochester
 Louisa Ann Murray (29 May 1790 – 21 February 1871); married Sir Robert Frankland-Russell, 7th Baronet. They had five daughters.
 Amelia Matilda Murray (30 April 1795 – 7 June 1884) 
 Rev. Edward Murray (5 November 1798 - 1 July 1852); married Ruperta Catherine Wright, daughter of Sir George Wright, 2nd Baronet and Rebecca MacLane. They had two sons, and two daughters.
 Henry Murray (1 February 1800 – 26 November 1830); married the Hon. Catherine Otway-Cave, daughter of Henry Otway, and Sarah Otway-Cave, 3rd Baroness Braye. They had no children.
 Caroline Leonora Murray (d. 8 January 1819); married Henry Fox-Strangways, 3rd Earl of Ilchester, and had two sons and two daughters.
 John Murray (d. 1803)
 Charles Murray (d. January 1808)

References

Attribution

External links
capsule biography, from the Gazetteer for Scotland
essay on his invention, from the Friends of Carmarthen County Museum

1761 births
1803 deaths
Archdeacons of Man
Bishops of St Davids
Younger sons of dukes
British inventors
George
19th-century Welsh Anglican bishops